Novoyansaitovo (Yañı Yänsäyet) is a rural locality (a village) in Baykinsky Selsoviet, Karaidelsky District, Bashkortostan, Russia. The population was 272 as of 2010. There are 6 streets.

Geography 
Novoyansaitovo is located 20 km southwest of Karaidel (the district's administrative centre) by road. Oktyabrsky is the nearest rural locality.

References 

Rural localities in Karaidelsky District